Shahrdari (Shohada) Square is a square in Shiraz, Iran where Hejrat Street, Piruzi Street and Zand Boulevard meet. There are Shiraz Municipality, Arg of Karim Khan and Shiraz main court near this location.

Transportation

Streets
 Zand Boulevard
 Hejrat Street
 Piruzi Street

Buses
 Route 1
 Route 2
 Route 14
 Route 35

Streets in Shiraz